Dust to Dust is a studio album by former 3rd Bass members Prime Minister Pete Nice and Daddy Rich. It was released on April 27, 1993, via Def Jam Recordings/Columbia Records/Sony Music Entertainment, a year after the breakup of 3rd Bass and featured many disses toward their former bandmate MC Serch. Recording sessions took place in New York at Rampant Recording Studio, Chung King Studios and LGK Studios. Production was handled by Pete Nice, DJ Richie Rich, The Beatnuts, KMD, and Sam Sever of Downtown Science.

The album found limited success, peaking at #171 on the Billboard 200, #50 on the Top R&B/Hip-Hop Albums and #8 on the Heatseekers Albums in the United States. It spawned two singles and music videos for "Rat Bastard" and "Kick the Bobo", both apparent disses against MC Serch. The video for "Rat Bastard" starts out as a recreation of a scene from the 1987 film The Untouchables, with Pete Nice beating an MC Serch lookalike to death with a baseball bat. The video for "Kick the Bobo" starts out as a recreation of a scene from the 1983 film Scarface, with Pete Nice talking to a Tony Montana lookalike. This album also marks the professional debut of indie rap artist Cage. Dust to Dust is now out of print.

Track listing

Charts

References

External links

1993 albums
3rd Bass albums
Def Jam Recordings albums
Albums produced by the Beatnuts
Albums recorded at Chung King Studios